General elections were held in Mexico in 1867. In the presidential election,  incumbent president Benito Juárez was re-elected with 72% of the vote.

Results

President

References

Mexico
General
Presidential elections in Mexico
Election and referendum articles with incomplete results